The following are politicians, family members, and assistants administrating the politics of Baltimore on The Wire.

Maryland State politicians

Clay Davis

 Played by: Isiah Whitlock, Jr.
 Appears in:
Season one: "One Arrest"; "The Cost" and "Cleaning Up".
Season two: "Hot Shots" and "Port in a Storm".
Season three: "Hamsterdam"; "Straight and True"; "Homecoming"; "Moral Midgetry" and "Slapstick".
Season four: "Soft Eyes"; "Margin of Error"; "Misgivings"; "A New Day" and "Final Grades".
Season five: "More with Less"; "Unconfirmed Reports"; "Not for Attribution"; "Transitions"; "React Quotes"; "The Dickensian Aspect"; "Took"; "Clarifications"; "Late Editions" and "-30-".

Clay Davis is a corrupt State Senator who is an important Democratic fundraiser. Baltimore mayors therefore try to stay on his good side.

Damien Lavelle Price
 Played by: Donnell Rawlings
 Appears in:
Season one: "One Arrest" and "Lessons".
Season five: "Not for Attribution" and "Took".
Damien Lavelle Price (also known as "Day Day") is an aide to Senator Clay Davis. He is a convicted felon who appears unrefined on several occasions, casually contemplating a home burglary at a public gathering (and in the presence of Cedric Daniels), and stating things such as, "Y'all tryin' to 'criminate me" while on the witness stand in court.

He acts as a bag man in collecting cash from drug organizations. Price is arrested with a bag of cash after making a pick-up from the Barksdale Organization in season 1 but is released without charge when Davis pressures Deputy Commissioner Ervin Burrell. Price reappears in Season 5 testifying as part of the case against Davis.

Odell Watkins
 Played by: Frederick Strother
 Appears in:
Season three: "Time After Time"; "Dead Soldiers"; "Homecoming"; "Slapstick"; "Middle Ground" and "Mission Accomplished".
Season four: "Soft Eyes"; "Home Rooms"; "Refugees"; "Alliances"; "Margin of Error"; "Unto Others"; "Final Grades".
Season five: "Unconfirmed Reports", "Transitions"

State Delegate Odell Watkins is a longtime major Baltimore political figure and a wheelchair user. Watkins is a member of the influential State Appropriations Committee with strong voter influence and is known as a kingmaker. Watkins is also the moral voice of authority within Baltimore politicians as he has full support of the religious leaders, looks to address the concerns of the citizens in an ethical and representable way, and is most critical of politicians prone to bribes and corruption.

In season three, Watkins backs Marla Daniels' campaign for the Western district council seat. Watkins believes that the council woman Marla aims to unseat, Eunetta Perkins, has become uninterested in the job. Initially, Mayor Royce resists, as Perkins was loyal to him. However, when he needs Watkins' support after a controversy involving Major Colvin legalizing drugs, Royce agrees to support Daniels.

Watkins is disappointed, feeling that Royce should have decisively fired Police Commissioner Ervin Burrell over the scandal. Royce claims that firing Burrell though would only fuel fire aimed towards city hall given the reasoning for the "Hamsterdam" fallout. Watkins also connects Daniels with Dennis Wise, helping the former criminal to open a boxing gym for local children in her district.

Watkins becomes further disillusioned after working with Royce's political rival Tommy Carcetti to secure funds for witness protection, and asking the mayor to match the funds. The mayor ignores their proposal, and Carcetti uses this against Royce in a debate after another witness is killed in the fourth season. Watkins, Carcetti, and Marla Daniels all attend the funeral of the murdered witness.

Watkins splits from Royce once and for all after he notices that Royce's campaign staff only has Daniels on his ticket in districts where she is strong, and has her opponent Eunetta Perkins in the same position in districts where Daniels is weaker. He is also angered by Royce's immorality in supporting corrupt developers and politicians (such as Clay Davis). Furthermore, Watkins claims that as Royce has "gotten into bed with every developer," he has forgotten his roots by not helping the city's African American community and is covering it up by using Marcus Garvey posters in his campaign.

Watkins angrily confronts Royce about his failure to keep his word and tells him he will no longer support his campaign, and instead sits out of the primary. Carcetti learns of Royce's failure to keep Watkins' trust through the police security detailed to protect the mayor as Deputy Rawls is looking to help the mayoral candidate who will do the right things with the PD. Carcetti appeals to Watkins to support him and become a guiding voice in his administration.

Watkins' support on the campaign trail swings the tight primary to Carcetti's favor, and he easily goes on to become Mayor. Watkins' first piece of advice to Carcetti is that he would be unable to fire Burrell because of his race and Baltimore's African American majority of voters. Watkins at the same time agrees with the others in the administration that an out of town African American police commissioner should be sought as he has no confidence in Burrell either.

Baltimore City Administration

Current

Nerese Campbell
 Played by: Marlyne Afflack
 Appears in:
Season four: "Boys of Summer"; "Margin of Error"; "Know Your Place"; "Misgivings"; and "That's Got His Own"
Season five: "More With Less"; "Unconfirmed Reports"; "Transitions"; "React Quotes"; "Clarifications"; "Late Editions"; and "–30–".

Nerese Campbell is the Democratic president of the Baltimore City council. She is the only member of Clarence Royce's campaign ticket to have won election to their respective position. Campbell voices opposition to Tommy Carcetti's plan to fire Commissioner Ervin Burrell claiming that a good portion of her constituency would be against this action. She is close to the ministers and politicians from Clarence Royce's era and frequently uses that influence as leverage against Carcetti.

She tells Carcetti that a gentleman's agreement had been in place whereby she would become the next mayor at the end of Royce's tenure. Carcetti replies that she may become mayor by default should he decide to run for governor in two years time. When issues pertaining to the city school system arise, Campbell suggests that Carcetti go to Maryland's Republican governor to beg for money to solve the district's $54 million deficit.

In the fifth season, Campbell is seen to influence and intimidate several key figures in politics and the police department.  She experiences backlash from previous construction deals made during the Royce administration, when the local newspaper runs a story saying the city council gave well known east side drug dealer Ricardo Hendrix, aka "Fat Faced Rick", over a million dollars to move his strip club to a new location in order to purchase the land it was currently on.  For a while this hinders her plans to become mayor. She also faces competition from States Attorney Rupert Bond who has political aspirations. 

Nerese is instrumental in convincing Burrell to retire quietly from being Police Commissioner by promising him a better retirement package which she would advocate for him to sit on a crime commission board, then a six figure salary position in Washington.  She similarly pressures Carcetti into approving the golden parachute for Burrell as it is the only way for him to eventually install Daniels as Commissioner.  When Clay Davis threatens to incriminate other politicians of the Royce administration when he feels ill-supported during his trial, it is Campbell who convinces him that it is more advantageous for him to go quietly.  Otherwise, he would return from prison and have "nowhere to hang his hat" in Baltimore. 

She advises him to follow ex-Commissioner Burrell's example, who has been promoted to a more lucrative job after leaving quietly when Mayor Carcetti fired him over falsified crime statistics.  Burrell had threatened Campbell to leak an FBI file about Cedric Daniels, Carcetti's candidate for new Commissioner, if the mayor fired him.  Campbell retains the file and threatens Daniels in the last episode of season 5 to reveal it, if he doesn't comply with the mayor's orders to falsify the crime statistics.  In the final montage of the series finale, it is revealed that Campbell becomes the Mayor of Baltimore after Tommy Carcetti leaves to become the Governor of Maryland.

Campbell bears similarities to former Baltimore mayor Sheila Dixon, who was the city council president and became mayor following Martin O'Malley's 2006 election as governor.

Tommy Carcetti

Tommy Carcetti is the new Mayor of Baltimore.

Marla Daniels
 Played by: Maria Broom
 Appears in:
Season 1: "The Detail"; "One Arrest"; "Lessons" and "Sentencing".
Season 2: "Collateral Damage"; "Backwash" and "Port in a Storm".
Season 3: "Time After Time"; "Hamsterdam"; "Homecoming"; "Slapstick" and "Mission Accomplished".
Season 4: "Home Rooms", "Refugees"
Season 5: "Not for Attribution", and "–30–".

Marla is the ex-wife of Colonel Cedric Daniels. She always had ambitions for her husband to progress in the police force and his failure to do so contributed to the demise of their relationship. As their marriage fell apart, she decided to run for City Council and was elected Councilwoman from the 11th District of Baltimore.

Cedric seems a likely candidate to receive a promotion when he is assigned to run the controversial Barksdale detail. Throughout the first season, Marla advised Cedric to build the case his superiors were demanding (quick and simple, with low-level busts) but he is pushed to more elaborate investigative work by the detectives he commands. He also meets Day Day Price while attending a function Marla drags him to, which turns out to be important for the investigation.

Cedric is banished to evidence control after upsetting his superiors and Marla convinces him to leave the department and become a lawyer. Cedric is ready to do so until he receives a second chance to do the kind of investigative work he wants in the new Sobotka detail. Marla greets his decision to stay with the BPD with worry and skepticism and eventually the couple separates.

Marla runs for City Council in season 3; Cedric appears publicly in uniform as a content husband to support her. Marla had the support and guidance of State Delegate Odell Watkins but ran against Eunetta Perkins, an old ally of Mayor Clarence Royce's. Because of this, Royce holds up Cedric's promotion to major. Marla eventually seeks a reconciliation with Cedric but he declines as he has become involved with Rhonda Pearlman. As a way of appeasing Watkins, the mayor eventually lends Marla his support and authorizes Cedric's promotion.

Even with the mayor's support, Marla has trouble overcoming her entrenched rival at the beginning of season 4. Marla, alongside Watkins, attends the funeral of a witness murdered in the district and learns that Tommy Carcetti is supportive of her campaign, despite her being part of Royce's ticket. Watkins switches to Carcetti's ticket at the last minute, Marla comes with him and wins the election.

Jerilee 'Gerry' Bennett 
 Played by: Karen Vicks
 Appears in season four: "Boys of Summer" (uncredited); "Soft Eyes" (uncredited); "Refugees"; "Margin of Error"; "Unto Others"; .
Jerilee Bennett was a key member of Tommy Carcetti’s campaign staff in the Mayoral election race. She helps to decide campaign strategy along with Norman Wilson and Theresa D'Agostino. She becomes a senior staffer in the Carcetti administration.

Anthony Gray
 Played by: Christopher Mann
 Appears in:
Season three: "Time After Time"; "Dead Soldiers"; "Hamsterdam"; "Straight and True"; "Homecoming"; "Moral Midgetry"; "Slapstick" and "Mission Accomplished".
Season four: "Boys of Summer", "Soft Eyes"; "Alliances"; "Margin of Error".
"Tony" Gray first appeared as a Democratic Baltimore Councilman in season three, working alongside his good friend Tommy Carcetti on the public safety subcommittee. Gray becomes disillusioned with Mayor Royce and uses his position on the committee to berate senior police officials including acting commissioner Burrell. Gray decides to run for mayor on an education platform. Carcetti encourages the decision, manipulating him to run.

Gray hopes that Carcetti would join his campaign with a position as council president as a reward, but Carcetti plans to run for mayor himself, and is hoping Gray will split the black voting majority and allow him to win. This deception upsets Gray and destroys their friendship.

In season four, Gray continues his stalling campaign. Carcetti's deputy campaign manager Norman Wilson feeds Gray a story about the police department covering up the murder of a state's witness. Wilson rationalizes that Gray cannot win the election and has to choose between losing with 24% of the vote or with 28%, the latter of which would do far more good to Gray's career and political credibility as well as help Carcetti win the election by taking valuable votes away from Royce. Gray acquiesces, and his public criticism of Royce is integral to Carcetti's eventual victory in the mayoral race. Gray's last appearances in the show are attending church with his wife on the eve of the election, and voting in the election itself.

Michael Steintorf
 Played by: Neal Huff
 Appears in
Season four: "That's Got His Own" and "Final Grades".
Season five: "More With Less"; "Unconfirmed Reports"; "Not for Attribution"; "Transitions"; "The Dickensian Aspect"; "Took"; "Clarifications"; "Late Editions"; and "–30–".
Michael Steintorf becomes Mayor Tommy Carcetti's chief of staff. Steintorf counsels Carcetti to reject the Governor's plan to force them to expend the political capital they need for Carcetti to later run for governor in exchange for the capital they need to rectify the deficit in the education budget. Steintorf continues to push Carcetti towards his run for Governor and their decision to decline the Governor's funding leaves the city with a difficult budget crisis.

Steintorf is concerned that Carcetti needs to pick a suitable successor so that people feel comfortable with him leaving Baltimore for the Governor's chair. Steintorf thinks that Nerese Campbell's links to corruption make her unsuitable and suggests that State's Attorney Rupert Bond might be a preferable alternative. Carcetti and Steintorf's focus on running for Governor brings criticism from Norman Wilson and State Delegate Odell Watkins but Steintorf believes Carcetti's ambitions are typical of the world as a whole.

Steintorf is pleased when Carcetti is able to fire Commissioner Ervin Burrell and supports the plan to replace him with Cedric Daniels in time. Carcetti and Steintorf reject State Senator Clay Davis' offer to smooth over the transitions in the police department in exchange for assistance in his corruption case. Steintorf is petulant when Campbell and the politically influential ministers use the situation in the police department to negotiate for political favors but Carcetti grants their demands.

Following the breaking of the homeless serial killer story Steintorf is instrumental in developing homelessness into a key issue for Carcetti's gubernatorial campaign. Steintorf is also involved in dealing with the budget ramifications of shifting resources back to the police department. Steintorf is responsible for pressuring the police department to provide a drop in crime to protect Carcetti from criticism and refuses to honor Carcetti's earlier promises to reform the police department.

Once the serial killer is revealed to be fake, Steintorf negotiates with William Rawls, Daniels, Bond, and Rhonda Pearlman to ensure that a thorough cover-up is put into effect. Rawls and Pearlman are rewarded for their co-operation with new posts. After the crisis is dealt with Steintorf renews pressure on Daniels to produce a drop in crime and order him to falsify statistics.

When Daniels refuses, Steintorf approaches Campbell and convinces her that Daniels will remain problematic when she replaces Carcetti as Mayor. Campbell intervenes and forces Daniels to step down and Steintorf receives his required statistics from his replacement, Stanislaus Valchek. At the close of the series Steintorf's machinations ensure that Carcetti becomes Governor.

Norman Wilson

Wilson is a former journalist, professional Democratic political operative and deputy manager of Tommy Carcetti's campaign in the mayoral race. He becomes Carcetti's deputy chief of staff after he is elected.

Former

Eunetta Perkins
 Played by: Unknown
 Appears in:
Season three: "Mission Accomplished"
Season four: "Refugees"; "Alliances"
Eunetta was the City Councilwoman from the 11th District of Baltimore. According to a commentary track, it was a running joke on the show that Perkins was never present at City Council meetings. Despite this, Mayor Royce sticks with her, due to her loyalty. Eventually, Royce agrees to support her opponent, Marla Daniels. Royce is seen supporting both candidates causing Odell Watkins to throw his support to Tommy Carcetti taking Daniels with him. Perkins remains on the ticket keeping the race tight, but ultimately loses the position to Marla Daniels.

Coleman Parker
 Played by: Cleo Reginald Pizana
 Appears in:
Season three: "Time After Time"; "Dead Soldiers"; "Straight and True"; "Homecoming"; "Back Burners"; "Reformation"; "Middle Ground" and "Mission Accomplished".
Season four: "Boys of Summer"; "Soft Eyes"; "Home Rooms"; "Refugees"; "Alliances"; "Unto Others" and "Final Grades".

Parker was the chief of staff and main advisor to Mayor Clarence Royce, organizing Royce's time and limiting access to the mayor. Parker relies on property developer Andy Krawczyk for large donations and assistance in fund raising. He organizes the mayor's re-election campaign including public speaking events with major property developers. He is also responsible for negotiations over debates with the mayor.

In season three, Parker is the first to see that Royce is politically vulnerable because of Baltimore's rising crime rate and urges the mayor to fire acting Police Commissioner Ervin Burrell. Royce resists, because he values loyalty and Burrell has always proved useful to him. When drug tolerant zones set up by police district commander Howard "Bunny" Colvin are exposed in Western Baltimore, Parker advisers that it would be a disaster to support them, despite a fall in the areas' crime rate.

Royce entertains the idea of extending the experiment, but Parker eventually convinces him that this would be too difficult to explain to the public. Parker again calls for Burrell to be fired and Royce agrees. However, Burrell convinces Royce that he will deflect responsibility off of Royce, and expects to receive a full term as commissioner as a reward for his loyalty. Parker and Royce privately agree to fire Burrell once they win re-election.

Parker first appears quick to crack down on Burrell and Demper when key political figures are served with subpoenas for their records by the Baltimore police department in season four. He and Royce extracts an assurance from Burrell that there will be no further surprises from the department. In Royce's first debate, opponent Tommy Carcetti scores points against him using knowledge of the recent murder of a state's witness.

The Mayor orders Parker to institute a series of measures to strike back against Carcetti, including disrupting Carcetti's campaign and bullying contributors into solely contributing to the Royce war chest, but Carcetti continues to gain on the Mayor in the polls. When Burrell reassigns the lead detective on the witness case this gives Carcetti, Royce's other opponent Anthony Gray uses this against him. Parker urges Royce to fire Burrell and this time he agrees.

Parker is dismayed when Royce alienates State Delegate Watkins, a key supporter with influence among religious leaders, by failing to support Watkins' protegee Marla Daniels. Parker desperately pursues Watkins to urge him to reconsider. This proves to be a turning point in the election race, and Royce is defeated by Carcetti. Royce and Parker later meet with Carcetti and his chief of staff Norman Wilson to amiably discuss the transfer of power. Parker is last seen discussing future prospects with Wilson, planning to either lead another campaign for Royce in a different office or, barring that, a "new buck".

Clarence Royce

Royce was the mayor of Baltimore, but Carcetti beat him in a primary upset.

Campaign staff

Theresa D'Agostino
 Played by: Brandy Burre
 Appears in:
Season three: "Hamsterdam"; "Straight and True"; "Homecoming"; "Back Burners"; "Moral Midgetry"; "Slapstick"; "Reformation"; "Middle Ground" and "Mission Accomplished".
Season four: "Boys of Summer"; "Soft Eyes"; "Home Rooms"; "Refugees"; "Alliances"; "Margin of Error"
Terry D'Agostino is a Washington-based political consultant and campaign fixer. She grew up in Baltimore and graduated from the University of Maryland School of Law at the same time as councilman Tommy Carcetti. In season three, Carcetti aggressively pursues D'Agostino to work as his campaign manager for his planned run for Mayor. She is reluctant to work for a white candidate in a predominantly African American city, but Carcetti convinces her he is worth taking a chance on.

Once on board, D'Agostino is quick to plan a strategy for the campaign. Carcetti suggests they use his colleague Tony Gray, who was also planning to run, to split the African American voter base. At the same time, D'Agostino meets Jimmy McNulty at a school open house for his sons and they quickly become involved in a strictly sexual relationship.

The relationship quickly sours after McNulty reveals his lack of culture and education, his lack of a college degree and, even worse, his indifference about politics over a rare dinner date. It then ends abruptly after D'Agostino meets him under the pretense of wanting to start back up again. McNulty ditches her when he realizes that she is pressing him for information about Bunny Colvin and Hamsterdam to help with Carcetti's campaign.

D'Agostino arranges for Carcetti to receive coaching on his public speaking. She felt that he is too focused on winning arguments and that he should put appearing likable first. When Carcetti discovers Colvin's Hamsterdam project, D'Agostino sees an opportunity to attack Royce, and encourages her candidate to use it. He uses this to launch into an inspiring speech, convincing many that he is a political force to be reckoned with.

In season four, the campaign is in full swing, and D'Agostino works alongside new deputy campaign manager Norman Wilson. She encourages Carcetti to become involved in fundraising, forcing him to stay in his office until he has raised set amounts. She also shields him as best she could from polling data that did not meet his expectations. D'Agostino's strategizing and Wilson's hard work on the campaign trail contribute to Carcetti's victory in the mayoral primary.

D'Agostino chooses the night of his win to approach him for her "win bonus" by seducing him. When Carcetti resists her advances she is bemused but respects his wishes. D'Agostino returns to Washington with a higher profile to work for the DCCC after her success in Baltimore.

Fund-raisers

Andy Krawczyk
 Played by: Michael Willis
 Appears in:
Season two: "Collateral Damage" (uncredited) and "Port in a Storm" (uncredited).
Season three: "Hamsterdam"; "Straight and True"; "Homecoming"; "Moral Midgetry"; "Middle Ground" and "Mission Accomplished". 
Season four: "Soft Eyes"; "Refugees"; "A New Day"; "That's Got His Own".
Season five: "The Dickensian Aspect"; and "–30–".
Krawczyk is a property developer who is at least marginally corrupt. He discusses Frank Sobotka's union business with Major Valchek. He is working on a model of the prospective grain pier condominium development which Sobotka is against. He is later shown breaking ground on the development with State Senator Davis.

In season three, Krawczyk is revealed to be the property developing consultant to Stringer Bell. He is constantly trying to calm Stringer down, explaining the business to him, and is ultimately present when Omar Little comes calling on Bell for revenge. In season four, he continues to make campaign donations to Clarence Royce in exchange for assistance with his property developments. Krawczyk is also a regular fixture at Royce's fundraising poker games, where players deliberately lose money to Royce to get around campaign finance laws.

Detective Kima Greggs serves Krawczyk with a subpoena for financial records, as part of Lester Freamon's investigation into the Barksdale money trail. Krawczyk does not seem particularly worried by this.

He is shown in seasons four and five in scenes exhibiting his political influence and trying to get "in" the new administration. In one of the mayor's meetings he is also revealed to be president of the school board, and takes no responsibility for the system's debt. There is some suggestive dialogue in the scene that hints he may be involved in the defrauding of the school budget.

Michael Willis had been a recurring character on David Simon's previous show, Homicide: Life on the Street, playing a deceitful corrupt lawyer.

Relatives

Jen Carcetti
 Played by: Megan Anderson
 Appears in:
Season three: "Dead Soldiers"; "Homecoming"; "Back Burners"; "Moral Midgetry"; "Reformation" and "Mission Accomplished".
Season four: "Boys of Summer"; "Soft Eyes"; "Margin of Error"; Final Grades.
Season five: "The Dickensian Aspect" (uncredited); "Clarifications"; and "–30–".
Jen Carcetti is the wife of councilman Tommy Carcetti. They have two children, a son and a daughter. Jen supports Tommy's political ambitions and is seemingly unaware of his infidelity.

References